Caroline Wozniacki was the two-time defending champion, but lost in the second round to Camila Giorgi. 

Karolína Plíšková won the title, defeating Naomi Osaka in the final, 6–4, 6–4. Plíšková won the title after saving two match points Alison Riske had against her in the quarterfinals.

Seeds
The top four seeds received a bye into the second round.

Draw

Finals

Top half

Bottom half

Qualifying

Seeds

Qualifiers

Qualifying draw

First qualifier

Second qualifier

Third qualifier

Fourth qualifier

Fifth qualifier

Sixth qualifier

References
Main Draw
Qualifying Draw

Toray Pan Pacific Open - Singles
2018 Singles
2018 Toray Pan Pacific Open